Count Vasily Vasilievich Kapnist (23 February 1758 – 9 November 1823), was a Russian poet, playwright and nobleman who was known as an active critic of serfdom in Russia and as a proponent of restoration of the Zaporozhian host in the region of southern Ukraine.

Life and work
Kapnist was born in Velikaya Obukhovka in the Kiev Governorate of the Russian Empire in 1758. According to family tradition, Kapnist's mother was a captive woman of Turkish origin. His paternal grandfather was a Venetian merchant of Greek origin from the island of Zakynthos. He was a descendant of the Venetian noble family of Capnissi (whose name derives from the Zakynthos surname Καπνίσης), he spent all his life in the manor of Obukhovka near Poltava. 

His lifelong friendship with Nikolay Lvov and Gavrila Derzhavin date from the early 1770s, when all three served in the Leub Guard. Derzhavin later married Kapnist's sister-in-law and visited the poet and his wife in Obukhovka more than once.

The extension of serfdom in the Russian Empire dismayed Kapnist and occasioned his two most notable poems, Ode on Slavery (1783) and Ode on the Elimination of Slavery in Russia (1786), in which he chastised serfdom as the principal pest of contemporary Russian society. His later poems belong to the Horatian tradition, anticipating Russian Romanticism in their social pessimism and admiration of simple family joys.

Kapnist revealed himself as a savage satirist in his most famous work, a satirical verse drama based on the poet's litigation against a neighbour and aptly entitled Chicane (1798). His victims are the judges and officers of law, whom he paints as an unredeemed lot of thieves and extortioners. The play is in rather harsh Alexandrines but produces a powerful effect by the force of its passionate sarcasm. The poem is based on the Russian custom of state-appointed judges, whereas at the time of Cossack Hetmanate the judges were previously elected. 

Although Kapnist dedicated his play to Emperor Paul, it was denounced by the censorship as scurrilous and libertarian. Banned after only four performances, it was not revived in St. Petersburg until 1805. According to D.S. Mirsky:

Kapnist-Problem and the so-called letter to Friedrich von Hertzberg

In 1788, Kapnist wrote a petition to Catherine the Great proposing the Empress to restore the Zaporozhian host and use its soldiers in the ongoing war against Turkey. However, when the military situation improved, the imperial government refused to implement this plan.

In 1896 a Polish historian Bronislav Dembrinsky has found a document, which is now known as the so-called letter to Friedrich von Hertzberg. In April 1791, someone named "Kapnist" had a secret meeting with Prussian chancellor Ewald Friedrich Graf von Hertzberg, trying to persuade the Prussian government to declare war on Russia in case an uprising starts of Zaporozhian Cossacks against Russian rule. Friedrich Wilhelm II refused to give his own consent for such an action. This letter was attributed by Bronislav Dembrinsky to Vasily Kapnist. However it is still not clear whether Vasily Kapnist truly could be the author of this letter and it remains unclear whether the real name could be used in the document. According to Olexandr Ohloblyn there are at least three relevant candidates, who could have written such letter using the name "Kapnist".

References

External links
 Biography of Kapnist
 Kapnist. Poems
English translations of 4 epigrams

1758 births
1823 deaths
Russian people of Greek descent
Russian people of Turkish descent 
People from Poltava Oblast
Ukrainian poets
Russian male poets
Ukrainian dramatists and playwrights
Russian dramatists and playwrights
Russian male dramatists and playwrights
Ukrainian satirists
Russian satirists
Members of the Russian Academy
Russian people of Ukrainian descent
Counts of the Russian Empire